Cape Conway is the rounded low and ice-free tipped cape forming the south extremity of Snow Island in the South Shetland Islands, Antarctica. It is a south entrance point for Boyd Strait. The area was visited by 19th century sealers.

Cape Conway was charted in 1829 by the British naval expedition under Captain Henry Foster and named after HMS Conway in which Foster had previously served.  Tooth Rock was descriptively named following a survey from RRS John Biscoe in 1951–52.

Location

See also 
 Composite Antarctic Gazetteer
 List of Antarctic islands south of 60° S
 SCAR
 Territorial claims in Antarctica

Maps
 L.L. Ivanov. Antarctica: Livingston Island and Greenwich, Robert, Snow and Smith Islands. Scale 1:120000 topographic map.  Troyan: Manfred Wörner Foundation, 2009.

References

External links
 SCAR Composite Antarctic Gazetteer.

Headlands of the South Shetland Islands